CCGS Cape Lambton  is one of the Canadian Coast Guard's 36 s. The vessel was built in 2000, in Kingston, Ontario and was stationed in Port Weller, on Lake Ontario, in March 2021. The ship is named for the southern tip of Banks Island in the Northwest Territories and in turn named for Lord Durham, John Lambton, 1st Earl of Durham.

Design
It contains two computer-operated Detroit DDEC-III 6V-92TA diesel engines providing a combined . It has two  four-blade propellers, and its complement is four crew members and five passengers.

Communication options include Raytheon 152 HF-SSB and Motorola Spectra 9000 VHF50W radios, and a Raytheon RAY 430 loudhailer system. The boat also supports the Simrad TD-L1550 VHF-FM radio direction finder. Raytheon provides a number of other electronic systems for the lifeboat, including the RAYCHART 620, the ST 30 heading indicator and ST 50 depth indicator, the NAV 398 global positioning system, a RAYPILOT 650 autopilot system, and either the R41X AN or SPS-69 radar systems.

References

Cape-class motor lifeboats
2000 ships
Ships built in Ontario
Ships of the Canadian Coast Guard